The 23rd South American Junior Championships in Athletics were held in Asunción, Paraguay from June 21–23, 1991.

Participation (unofficial)

Detailed result lists can be found on the "World Junior Athletics History" website.  An unofficial count yields the number of about 212 athletes from about 9 countries:  Argentina (47), Bolivia (6), Brazil (58), Chile (33), Colombia (6), Ecuador (16), Paraguay (28), Peru (12), Uruguay (6).

Medal summary
Medal winners are published for men and women
Complete results can be found on the "World Junior Athletics History" website.

Men

Women

Medal table (unofficial)

References

External links
World Junior Athletics History

South American U20 Championships in Athletics
1991 in Paraguayan sport
South American U20 Championships
International athletics competitions hosted by Paraguay
1991 in youth sport
Sports competitions in Asunción
June 1991 sports events in South America
1990s in Asunción